Major William Frank Thompson (17 August 1920 – 10 June 1944) was a British officer who acted as a liaison between the British Army and the Bulgarian communist partisans during the Second World War.

Early life, family, and education
Thompson was born in Darjeeling, Bengal Presidency, British India to a British missionary family. He was educated at Winchester College and New College, Oxford. Freeman Dyson, a fellow pupil at Winchester, has described Thompson's extraordinary facility with diverse languages and that "Frank was the largest, the loudest, the most uninhibited and the most brilliant." Dyson "learned from him more than I learned from anybody else at the school".

His younger brother, E.P. Thompson, was an English historian, socialist and peace campaigner.

Second World War
In 1939, while studying at the University of Oxford, he became a member of the Communist Party of Great Britain under the influence of his close friend Iris Murdoch. Despite his affiliation, he did not support the party's policy of neutrality dictated by the Molotov-Ribbentrop Pact and joined the British Army with service number 124039 as a volunteer training with the No. 122 Officer Cadet Training Regiment before being commissioned Second Lieutenant into the Royal Artillery on 2 March 1940.
He served in England, North Africa, Syria, Iraq, Sicily, Serbia and Bulgaria. He was part of the Special Operations Executive.

The commandos carried a radio to keep in contact with the staff in Cairo, Egypt and Bari, Italy, but it broke down. On 23 May, Thompson took part in the clash at the village of Batulia between the Bulgarian Gendarmerie and the Second Sofia Brigade of National Liberation of the partisans. He was wounded by the gendarmerie forces, captured and, after a defiant speech in Bulgarian at his show trial, was executed by firing squad in the nearby village of Litakovo.

After the war and the establishment of a Communist government in Bulgaria, the nearby villages of Livage, Lipata, Tsarevi Stragi, Malak Babul, Babul and Zavoya were merged and renamed to Thompson (Томпсън) in the British officer's honour. Similarly, the railway station at Prokopnik, the site of a fierce battle, became "Major Thompson Station".

E.P. Thompson wrote two books about his brother, the first with his mother, There is a Spirit in Europe: A Memoir of Frank Thompson. The second, Beyond the Frontier: the Politics of a Failed Mission, Bulgaria 1944, appeared in 1996.

Honours
Thompson Hill in Antarctica is named after Frank Thompson.

References
Footnotes

Bibliography
 
 
 CWGC entry
 Stowers Johnson, Agents extraordinary,

Further reading
 
 
 
 Kristen R. Ghodsee, "Who was Frank Thompson?" Vagabond Magazine, No. 85, November 2013.

People executed by Bulgaria by firing squad
British people executed abroad
British World War II prisoners of war
British Special Operations Executive personnel
British Army personnel killed in World War II
Royal Artillery officers
Linguists from the United Kingdom
People educated at Winchester College
Alumni of New College, Oxford
Communist Party of Great Britain members
People from Darjeeling
1920 births
1944 deaths
Indian people executed abroad
20th-century executions by Bulgaria
20th-century linguists
Military personnel of British India
Special Operations Executive personnel killed in World War II